Lipponen is a Finnish surname. Notable people with the surname include:

 Paavo Lipponen (born 1941), Finnish politician and former reporter
 Mika Lipponen (born 1964), Finnish footballer
 Jari Lipponen (born 1979), Finnish archer
 Ky Lipponen (born 2004), Finnish gangster
 David Lipponen (born 1963), Finnish footballer
 Ralph Lipponen (born 1963), Finnish footballer

Finnish-language surnames